Spy TV is an American hidden camera reality television series hosted by Michael Ian Black and Ali Landry. The show was broadcast on NBC in which pranks were pulled on people by their friends. The show was cancelled after two seasons.

References

External links
 

2000s American reality television series
2001 American television series debuts
2002 American television series endings
NBC original programming